La Loyère is a former commune in the Saône-et-Loire department in the region of Bourgogne-Franche-Comté in eastern France. On 1 January 2016, it was merged into the new commune of Fragnes-La Loyère.

See also
Communes of the Saône-et-Loire department

References

Former communes of Saône-et-Loire